The Fremouw Formation is a Triassic-age rock formation in the Transantarctic Mountains of Antarctica. It contains the oldest known fossils of tetrapods from Antarctica, including synapsids, reptiles and amphibians. Fossilized trees have also been found. The formation's beds were deposited along the banks of rivers and on floodplains. During the Triassic, the area would have been a riparian forest at 70–75°S latitude.

Stratigraphy 
The Fremouw Formation is mostly Triassic in age, with the oldest rocks dating back to the latest Permian. Much of the formation is quartzose sandstone that was deposited in stream beds. It overlies the Permian Buckley Formation, which consists of coal and Glossopteris fossils. The formation is informally divided into lower, middle, and upper units. Most fossils are found in the Lower Fremouw Formation. Here, bones are preserved in fine grained siltstones and mudstones, coarse grained channel sandstones, and conglomerates.

Paleoenvironment 

Well-preserved plants are common in the Fremouw Formation. Logs have been found in channel deposits and roots and stems have been found in permineralized soil. Smaller fossils on Fremouw Peak include cycads, horsetails, seed ferns, Osmundaceae ferns, and even fungi. One cycad called Antarcticycas is similar in appearance to the living Bowenia of Australia. In 2003, 99 fossilized tree trunks were described from Gordon Valley. These trunks comprise an intact fossilized forest, allowing for an estimation of the distribution of plants and tree cover. Dicroidium fossils are present around the conifer-like stumps, suggesting that they were the leaves of these large trees. Based on the geology of the area, the trees grew alongside riverbanks and on floodplains. The structure of the plants show no adaptation toward cold tolerance, suggesting that the climate was much warmer in the Triassic.

The Fremouw Formation preserves many tetrapod fossils that span the Permo-Triassic boundary, which marks the Permo-Triassic mass extinction. Around the world, the fossil record of many tetrapod groups is absent or very limited in Early Triassic rocks, implying a major decline in diversity after the extinction. The presence of many of these groups in Middle Triassic strata indicate that long ghost lineages must have extended back into the Early Triassic. Tetrapods such as temnospondyl amphibians, diapsid reptiles, and dicynodont therapsids are common in the Late Permian and seemed to have recovered by the Middle Triassic, but there is little record of their presence in the Early Triassic. All of these tetrapods are present in Early Triassic strata of the Fremouw Formation, suggesting that Antarctica served as a refugium for these animals. During the extinction, global temperatures rose and the supercontinent Pangea moved northward, putting pressure on populations that could not adapt to the warming climate. Antarctica, while much warmer in the Early Triassic than it is today, was cooler than other parts of Gondwana and may have been more hospitable to tetrapod populations. Antarctica's milder climate allowed many groups to take refuge in the region while other populations experienced decline. In the Early Triassic, many Fremouw Formation tetrapods had smaller body sizes than their Permian ancestors, and many were adapted for burrowing. Both of these characteristics are seen as adaptations to Antarctica's greater seasonal variability and protracted day-night cycles.

Biota 
The first tetrapod or land-living vertebrate from Antarctica was found in the Fremouw Formation and described in 1968. It was represented by a small bone fragment that is probably part of the left mandible of a temnospondyl amphibian. The bone was found the previous year by a researcher from Ohio State University who was studying the geology of the Transantarctic Mountains. The animal was later named Austrobrachyops jenseni. After its discovery, paleontological expeditions were launched to the area around the Beardmore Glacier to uncover more fossils. Since then, fragmentary remains of temnospondyls, therapsids, and archosauriform reptiles have all been found in the formation. These fossils are found around the Shackleton and Beardmore glaciers in places such as Gordon Valley and Fremouw Peak.

Tetrapods

Temnospondyls

Reptiles

Synapsids

See also 
 List of fossiliferous stratigraphic units in Antarctica

References 

Geologic formations of Antarctica
Triassic Antarctica
Permian System of Antarctica
Triassic System of Antarctica
Sandstone formations
Siltstone formations
Mudstone formations
Fluvial deposits
Paleontology in Antarctica
Permian south paleopolar deposits
Dufek Coast